Vesyoloye is a rural locality (a selo) and the administrative center of Vesyolovskoye Rural Settlement, Krasnogvardeysky District, Belgorod Oblast, Russia. The population was 2,156 as of 2010. There are 10 streets.

Geography 
Vesyoloye is located 22 km west of Biryuch (the district's administrative centre) by road. Podgorskoye is the nearest rural locality.

References 

Rural localities in Krasnogvardeysky District, Belgorod Oblast